Triiron dodecarbonyl is the organoiron compound with the formula Fe3(CO)12. It is a dark green solid that sublimes under vacuum.  It is soluble in nonpolar organic solvents to give intensely green solutions. Most low-nuclearity clusters are pale yellow or orange. Hot solutions of Fe3(CO)12 decompose to an iron mirror, which can be pyrophoric in air.The solid decomposes slowly in air, and thus samples are typically stored cold under an inert atmosphere. It is a more reactive source of iron(0) than iron pentacarbonyl.

Synthesis
It was one of the first metal carbonyl clusters synthesized.  It was occasionally obtained from the thermolysis of Fe(CO)5:
3 Fe(CO)5 → Fe3(CO)12 + 3 CO
Traces of the compound are easily detected because of its characteristic deep green colour. UV-photolysis of Fe(CO)5 produces Fe2(CO)9, not Fe3(CO)12.

The usual synthesis of Fe3(CO)12 starts with the reaction of Fe(CO)5 with base:
3 Fe(CO)5 + (C2H5)3N + H2O → [(C2H5)3NH][HFe3(CO)11] + 3 CO + CO2
followed by oxidation of the resulting hydrido cluster with acid:
 [(C2H5)3NH][HFe3(CO)11] + HCl + CO → Fe3(CO)12 + H2 + [(C2H5)3NH]Cl

The original synthesis by Walter Hieber et al. entailed the oxidation of H2Fe(CO)4 with manganese dioxide. The cluster was originally formulated incorrectly as "Fe(CO)4".

Structure

Elucidation of the structure of Fe3(CO)12 proved to be challenging because the CO ligands are disordered in the crystals. Early evidence for its distinctive C2v structure came from Mössbauer spectroscopic measurements that revealed two quadrupole doublets with similar isomer shifts but different (1.13 and 0.13 mm s−1) quadrupolar coupling constants.

Fe3(CO)12 consists of a triangle of iron atoms surrounded by 12 CO ligands. Ten of the CO ligands are terminal and two span an Fe---Fe edge, resulting in C2v point group symmetry. By contrast, Ru3(CO)12 and Os3(CO)12 adopt D3h-symmetric structures, wherein all 12 CO ligands are terminally bound to the metals. In solution Fe3(CO)12 is fluxional, resulting in equivalencing all 12 CO groups on the 13C NMR timescale. Overall, it can be appreciated that these three clusters formally arise from condensation of three 16-electron M(CO)4 fragments, akin to the theoretical condensation of three methylene (:CH2) molecules into cyclopropane.

The anion [HFe3(CO)11]− is structurally related to Fe3(CO)12, with the hydride replacing one bridging CO ligand. The bonding in the Fe-H-Fe subunit is described using concepts developed for diborane.

Reactions
Solutions of Fe3(CO)12 reacts with triphenylphosphine to give (triphenylphosphine)iron tetracarbonyl (and some bis(triphenylphosphine)iron tricarbonyl).

Heating Fe3(CO)12 gives a low yield of the carbido cluster Fe5(CO)15C. Such reactions proceed via disproportionation of CO to give CO2 and carbon.

Fe3(CO)12 forms "ferroles" upon reaction with heterocycles such as thiophenes.

Fe3(CO)12 reacts with thiols and disulfides to give thiolate-bridged complexes, such as methylthioirontricarbonyl dimer: 
2 Fe3(CO)12 + 3 (CH3)2S2 → 3 [Fe(CO)3SCH3]2 + 6 CO. These complexes are studied as hydrogenase mimics.

Safety
Fe3(CO)12 is hazardous as a source of carbon monoxide. Solid samples, especially when finely divided, and residues from reactions can be pyrophoric, which can ignite the organic solvents used for such reactions.

References

Carbonyl complexes
Iron complexes
Organoiron compounds
Chemical compounds containing metal–metal bonds
Iron(0) compounds